National Highway 168A, commonly called NH 168A is a national highway in  India. It is a spur road of National Highway 68. NH-168A traverses the states of Gujarat and Rajasthan in India.

Route

Rajasthan 
Sanchore

Gujarat 
Dhanera, Deesa.

Junctions  
 
  Terminal near Sanchore.
  near Dhanera
  Terminal near Deesa.

See also 
 List of National Highways in India
 List of National Highways in India by state

References

External links 
NH 168A on OpenStreetMap

National highways in India
National Highways in Rajasthan
National Highways in Gujarat